The flag of Bosnia and Herzegovina contains a medium blue field with a yellow right triangle separating said field, and there are seven full five-pointed white stars and two half stars top and bottom along the hypotenuse of the triangle.

The three points of the triangle stand for the three main ethnic groups (or "constituent peoples") of Bosnia and Herzegovina: Bosniaks, Croats, and Serbs. The triangle represents the approximate shape of the territory of Bosnia and Herzegovina.

The stars, representing Europe, are meant to be infinite in number and thus they continue from top to bottom. The flag features colors often associated with neutrality and peace – white, blue, and yellow. They are also colors traditionally associated with Bosnian culture and history. The blue background is evocative of the flag of the European Union.

The Bosnian national flag is also used for official purposes by the Federation of Bosnia and Herzegovina, one of the constituent entities of Bosnia and Herzegovina.

History

Bosnian Banate from 1154 until 1377 
Used by Stjepan II Kotromanic.

Bosnian Kingdom from 1377 until 1463 
The flag of the Kingdom of Bosnia was based on coat of arms of the Bosnian dynasty Kotromanić, king Tvrtko I and his successors. The flag of medieval Bosnia was white with the coat of arms of the Kotromanić dynasty in the middle which consisted of a blue shield with six gold fleur de lys displayed around a white bend.

Western Herzegovina 1760 flag
The green flag with the white crescent and star pointing to the left was used by Bosniak landlords in border parts in southern and western Herzegovina. The flag was most commonly used in wars. It also accompanied the troops of the Eyalet of Bosnia during the second siege of Khotyn in Moldavia. It differs from Ottoman flag by size and direction of crescent, as well as its swallow-shape, similar to some West-European jacks and ensigns.

Bosnian Revolt of 1830s flag
In the 1830s revolt by Husein Gradaščević the green flag with a yellow crescent and star was used. The revolt's aim was for Bosnia to gain autonomy from the Ottoman Empire.

Austro-Hungarian rule
When the Austro-Hungarian Empire annexed Bosnia and Herzegovina the flag was changed. The province of Bosnia used a flag that was red and yellow horizontally, but the province of Herzegovina used the same flag but with reversed colors (yellow and red).
The coat of arms is one of Stjepan Vukčić Kosača, Bosnian noble and duke from 14th century. The original medieval coat of arms had a white background and two red stripes in the top of the shield. It was Similar to the old flag of the Western Bosnian Flag.

Yugoslav period

Democratic Federal Yugoslavia (1942–1946) 
After World War II, in 1945, the red star flag became universally official. It was given its final shape by enlarging the star and adding a narrow yellow border. The flag was usually accompanied on official buildings by the flag of the federal republic and the flag of the League of Communists of Yugoslavia. Because of this, many buildings in former Bosnia and Herzegovina still carry a three-poled flag holder. A smaller version of the flag served as the civil ensign while an elongated banner version was seen flown in front of the Yugoslav parliament.

Socialist Federal Republic of Yugoslavia (1946–1992) 
While being the Socialist Republic of Bosnia and Herzegovina within communist Yugoslavia, the Yugoslav flag stood as a canton, while the rest of the flag was red to symbolise the socialism and communism in Yugoslavia at the time. Bosnia and Herzegovina also had a new coat of arms during Yugoslav rule; it was a symbol of Bosnian industrialism at the time. This flag is similar to the flag of the Soviet Union and the flag of China.

Independent Republic of Bosnia and Herzegovina (1992–1998) 

On 3 March 1992 Bosnia and Herzegovina declared its independence from Yugoslavia. Initially the newly independent Republic of Bosnia and Herzegovina continued to use the flag of the Socialist Republic of Bosnia and Herzegovina until a new flag was adopted on 20 May 1992. 
The flag picked was the arms of the Kings of Bosnia Kotromanić dynasty, who ruled from 1377 until 1463 over the area that is present day Bosnia and Herzegovina and Dalmatia, consisted of a blue shield with six golden lilies displayed around a white bend; the golden lily is the Lilium bosniacum, which is a native lily to the area. 
The flag chosen in 1992 has a white background with the Bosnian lily in the center. Though it is no longer an official flag of the state, the flag continues to be used unofficially by Bosniak civilians as a sort of ethnic flag, used at football games, as part of political rallies, and other such events.

Bosnia and Herzegovina after the Dayton Accords
The Bosnian Serbs who lived in Bosnia and Herzegovina after the signing of the Dayton Agreement viewed the flag with the six fleurs-de-lys as only representing the Bosniaks (i.e. Bosnian Muslims) of Bosnia and Herzegovina. The flag of the state was eventually changed into the current, post-1998 flag. The current flag was introduced by the UN High Representative Carlos Westendorp after the Parliament of Bosnia and Herzegovina could not decide on a solution that was acceptable to all parties. Aside from the colors, the current flag contains no historical or other references to the Bosnian state. The flag is rarely ever seen in the Republika Srpska, whose residents prefer to fly either that entity's regional flag or the Serbian national flag instead. Some Bosniaks dislike or have no particular affinity for the flag, preferring the former Bosnian national flag used from 1992 to 1998 (which remains used by some Bosniaks as a sort of ethnic flag), or the former socialist-era Yugoslav flag instead.

Colors scheme

The official colors of the flag are:

Alternative flag proposals 
The first flag that was proposed in the First Set of Proposals was the "Czech Pattern", similar to the flag of the Czech Republic.  It was intended to represent all three constitutive nations living in Bosnia and Herzegovina.  The next proposal was the "Laurel branch".  It is based on the light blue colour of the United Nations Flag.  It would have had a golden olive branch in the middle.  The olive branch is taken from the United Nations emblem.  The flag would have only one branch.  The branch was rotated around 30 degrees counterclockwise.  The third proposal was the "Map" proposal.  It would also use the United Nations light blue colour; however, there would be the addition of a white outline map of Bosnia and Herzegovina.  No official text was ever published specifying the colour of the outline, but it probably would have been white.

The Second Set of Proposals had flags that were truly representative of Bosnia and Herzegovina as a whole.  The first flag design was a diagonally striped tricolor pattern of red to white to blue (different colors but in the same pattern as the Flag of the Republic of the Congo). In the centre there would be a blue map of Bosnia and Herzegovina outlined in yellow in the middle inside a circle of 10 five-pointed yellow stars.  The flag would have been a 1:2 ratio. The second flag proposed was very similar except it had 12 five-pointed stars to represent the European Union.  The Flag of Europe has the 12 five-pointed stars.  The third design was a bit more different from the first two designs. The diagonal tricolour shape was kept, but the diagonal white stripe was made wider so that the angle was not perfectly 45 degrees.  In the center there was a yellow map of Bosnia and Herzegovina outlined in green and under it there were two green olive branches.  The olive branch pattern was the same one that the United Nations uses in its flag.  The final fourth design was kept the same emblem from the third design, but did not have the diagonal stripes. Instead it had a horizontal tricolour pattern of blue, white, and red (from top to bottom), similar to that of the former Yugoslavia.

The first Westendorp alternative flag was a highly similar one to today's flag, a diagonally divided top-hoist to bottom-fly yellow over light blue flag with line of 9 white five-pointed stars in the light blue field along the diagonal. The only major difference was that the color of the background was UN blue. The second Carlos Westendorp alternative flag is a light blue flag (using the United Nations' flag's colors) with 5 bars interchangeably coming out of hoist and not reaching the other end. The colors are interchangeably yellow and white. In the third alternative flag, the field was light blue and had five narrow yellow bars.

Westendorp's decision ended up being the first alternative flag. However, it was changed slightly to a darker blue, evocative of the European Union's flag.

Flags of administrative divisions

Entities of Bosnia and Herzegovina

See also 

 List of Bosnian and Herzegovinian flags
 Coat of arms of Bosnia and Herzegovina
 Flag of the Federation of Bosnia and Herzegovina
 Flag of Republika Srpska
 Federation of Bosnia and Herzegovina
Flag of Kosovo

References

External links 

Bosnia and Herzegovina
 
Bosnia and Herzegovina
Bosnia and Herzegovina